Ravindra Kottahachchi (born 2 August 1975) is a Sri Lankan cricket umpire. He has umpired in domestic matches in cricket tournaments in Sri Lanka, such as the 2017–18 SLC Twenty20 Tournament and the 2017–18 Premier League Tournament. In March 2018, he was one of the two onfield umpires for the semi-final match between Nondescripts Cricket Club and Saracens Sports Club in the 2017–18 Premier Limited Overs Tournament.

In international cricket, he has stood in a Women's One Day International match between Sri Lanka and Australia in September 2016 and a two-day match during Bangladesh's tour of Sri Lanka in March 2017.

References

External links
 

1975 births
Living people
Sri Lankan cricket umpires
Place of birth missing (living people)